Homoeosoma phaeoboreas is a species of snout moth in the genus Homoeosoma. It was described by R. L. Goodson and Herbert H. Neunzig in 1993. It is found in the western U.S. state of Washington.

References

Moths described in 1993
Phycitini